Green Oasis School is an international school in Tianmian Village, Futian District, Shenzhen.

GOS is a year 1-6 primary school that is open to both local and expatriate children aged 5 to 10. The school follows an adapted version of the UK National Curriculum for England. The study of Chinese language and culture is prioritized. 

Students in Year 6 may transfer to Shenzhen Oasis International School, a dedicated middle school with the same Vision and Mission as Green Oasis School that continues to teach the UK National Curriculum for England with the addition of Chinese curriculum mathematics.  

In 2021, Green Oasis School will celebrate its 20th anniversary.

References

External links
 Green Oasis School
 Green Oasis School 

2001 establishments in China
Educational institutions established in 2001
Futian District
Schools in Shenzhen